This is a list of songs about or referencing killers.  The songs are divided into groups by the last name of the killer the song is about or mentions.

A–B

Axeman of New Orleans
 "The Mysterious Axman's Jazz (Don't Scare Me Papa)" – Joseph John Davilla

Joe Ball
"Joe Ball was his name" – Macabre

Elizabeth Báthory
"An Execution" – Siouxsie and the Banshees
"Bathe in Blood" – Evile
"Báthory Erzsébet" - Sunn O)))
"Beauty Through Order" – Slayer
"The Bleeding Baroness" –  Candlemass
"Countess Bathory" - Venom
"Countess Erszebeth Nadasdy" – Barathrum
Cruelty and the Beast album by Cradle of Filth
 Die Blutgräfin album by Untoten
"Elizabeth" – Aiden
"Elizabeth" – Ghost
Elizabeth album – Kamelot
"Elizabeth Bathory" – Tormentor
"Rose of Pain" – X Japan
"To the Memory of the Dark Countess" – Mütiilation
"Torquemada 71" – Electric Wizard
"Woman of Dark Desires" – Bathory
"The Wrath of Satan's Whore" – Countess

Robert Berdella
"Diary of Torture" – Macabre

David Berkowitz
".44 Magnum Opus" - Exodus
"Bay of Pigs" – The Acacia Strain
"Cereal Killer" – Green Jellÿ
"Death 2" – Flatbush Zombies
"Diddy Doo Wop (I Hear The Voices)" – Hall & Oates
"Ditty" – Barkmarket
"I Hear Black" – Overkill
"Hello From the Gutter" – Overkill
"Hot Damn" – Ivy Levan
"Insane in the Brain" – Cypress Hill
"Jumping at Shadows" – Benediction
"Looking Down the Barrel of a Gun" – Beastie Boys
"Mr. 44" – Electric Hellfire Club
"Reign In Blood" – Necro
"(Sam), Son of Man" – Marilyn Manson and The Spooky Kids
"Stay Wide Awake" – Eminem
"Son of A Gun (David Berkowitz)" – Church of Misery
"Son of Sam" - Chain Gang
"Son of Sam" – Dead Boys
"Son of Sam" – Elliott Smith
"Son of Sam" – Macabre
"Son of Sam" – Shinedown
"Son of Sam" – Violent Soho
"Summer Of Sam" – Lana Del Rey
"Unseen Darkness" – Sinister

Kenneth Bianchi & Angelo Buono
"Hillside Strangler" – The Destructors
"Hillside Strangler" – The Hollywood Squares
"The Hillside Stranglers" – Macabre
"I Wanna Make You Scream" – Battalion of Saints
"Notown Blues" – The Black Lips

Ian Brady & Myra Hindley
"Archives of Pain" – Manic Street Preachers
"Lambs to the Slaughter" – Church of Misery
"Mother Earth" – Crass
"No One Is Innocent" – The Sex Pistols
"Suffer Little Children" – The Smiths
"Very Friendly" – Throbbing Gristle

Jerry Brudos
"Fatal Foot Fetish" – Macabre
"Truest Shade of Crimson – Through the Eyes of the Dead

Ted Bundy
"Anne" – Bloodbath
"Black Friday" – Lil' Kim
"Blackest Eyes" – Porcupine Tree
"Blow" – Tyler, the Creator
"Bundy" – Animal Alpha
"Bundy's DNA" – Acid Drinkers
"Crack" – Slowthai
"Death 2" – Flatbush Zombies
"The Drifter" – Green on Red
"epaR" – Earl Sweatshirt 
"I, Motherfucker (Ted Bundy)" – Church of Misery
 “Just another psycho” - Motley Crüe
”Lotta True Crime”- Penelope Scott
"Meticulous Invagination" – Aborted
"Mr. Gore" – Blitzkid
"Murder Dividead" – Edge Of Sanity
"Reign In Blood" - Necro
"Serial Killer"  – Vio-lence
"Stay Wide Awake" – Eminem
"Stripped, Raped and Strangled" – Cannibal Corpse
"Ted Bundy" - Theory of a Deadman
"The Ted Bundy Song" – Macabre
"Ted, Just Admit It" – Jane's Addiction
"Till Death" – Lord Infamous
"Torch Song Trilogy" - Handsome Boy Modeling School
"Video Crimes" - Tin Machine
"Warrior" - Swollen Members
"We Want Cunt" – Jeffree Star
"What Turns You on?" – The Cassandra Complex
"Wheels on the bug" – Macabre

C–F

Richard Chase
"Blood Sucking Freaks (Richard Chase)" – Church of Misery
"House Sparrow" – Xiu Xiu
"I Refuse" - Brotha Lynch Hung

Andrei Chikatilo
"Psychopathy Red" – Slayer
"Red Ripper Blues (Andrei Chikatilo)" – Church of Misery
"Ripper von Rostow" – Eisregen
"Rostov Ripper" – Impious
"The Butcher of Rostov" – Blood Tsunami

Adolfo Constanzo
"El Padrino (Adolfo Constanzo)" – Church of Misery
"Sacrifical Shack" – Pain Teens

Dean Corll
"Candyman" – Monte Cazazza
"Candyman (Dean Corll)" – Church of Misery

Jeffrey Dahmer
"213" – Slayer
"Arcarsenal" – At The Drive-In
 "Bagpipes from Baghdad" – Eminem
 "Bandit" – Juice WRLD ft. NBA YoungBoy
 "Benz or Beamer" – Outkast
"Body Parts" – Three 6 Mafia
 "Brainless" – Eminem
"Cannibal" – Kesha
"Celebrity Cannibalism" – Creaming Jesus
"Choklit Factory" – Marilyn Manson
"Control" – The Black Dahlia Murder
"Da Graveyard" – Big L
Dahmer – Macabre
"Dahmer and the Limbs" – Nicole Dollanganger
"Dahmer Does Hollywood" - Amigo the Devil
"Dahmer is Dead" – Violent Femmes
"Danger Zone" – Big L
"Dark Horse" – Katy Perry ft. Juicy J
"Death 2" – Meechy Darko
"Dirty Frank" – Pearl Jam
"Electric City" – Black Eyed Peas
"Freeze Dried Man" – Macabre
"God Bless" – Combichrist
"I'm On It" – J. Cole
"Jeffrey" – Juice WRLD
"Jeffrey Dahmer" – Soulfly
"Keep it Underground" – Lords of the Underground
"KKKill the Fetus" - Esham
"Killer" - Phoebe Bridgers
"Lift Me Up" - Vince Staples
"Lord Dahmer" - Final Solution
"Marlon JD" – Manic Street Preachers
"Moonshine" - Swollen Members
"Must Be The Ganja" - Eminem
"Murder Avenue" - Geto Boys
"Nature of the threat" - Ras Kass
"Natural Born Killaz - Dr. Dre ft. Ice Cube
"Now I'm High, Really High" − Three 6 Mafia
"Orange Juice" - EarlWolf
"Particle Accelerator" - Tad
"Pretty Boy Swag" - Tyga
"Psycopath Killer" - Eminem ft Slaughterhouse & Yelawolf
"Rage All Over" - Wargasm
"Rap, Soda y Bohemia" – Molotov
"Reign In Blood" - Necro
"Room 213" – Church of Misery
"Room 213" – Dead Moon
 "Room 213" - G.G.F.H.
"Said the Spider to the Fly" - the pAper chAse
"Sandwitches" - Tyler the Creator
"Siccmade" - Brotha Lynch Hung
"Sinthasomphone" – Venetian Snares
"Spooky Mormon Hell Dream" - Andrew Rannells
"Still Born/Still Life" – Christian Death
"Straight Boys" - Jeffree Star
"The Ballad Of Jeffrey Dahmer" – Pinkard & Bowden
 "Things Get Worse" - Eminem Ft. B.o.B
"Tom Dahmer Mixtape Freestyle" – Necro
"Transformer" – Future ft. Nicki Minaj
"Trigger Inside" - Therapy?
"Usual Suspects" – Hollywood Undead
"You're Gonna Love This"- 3OH!3
"What's That Smell?" – Macabre

Albert DeSalvo
"The Boston Strangler" – Macabre
"Boston Strangler (Albert DeSalvo)" – Church of Misery
"Dedicated to Albert De Salvo" – Whitehouse
"Dirty Water" – The Standells
"Midnight Rambler" – The Rolling Stones

Dnepropetrovsk maniacs
"Dealers of Fame" - Oh, Sleeper

Mark Essex
"Soul Discharge (Mark Essex)" – Church of Misery

Albert Fish
"27 Needles" – John 5
"Albert Fish/Liverwurst" – Green Jellÿ
"Albert Was Worse Than Any Fish In The Sea" – Macabre
"Document: Grace Budd" – The Number Twelve Looks Like You
"Fish" - Tyler, the Creator
"Fishtales" – Macabre
"The Gray Man (Albert Fish)" – Church of Misery
"Instruments of Hell" – Exhumed
"Human Consumption" - Necro
"Letter to Mother" - Divine Heresy
"Mr. Albert Fish (Was Children Your Favourite Dish?)" – Macabre
"Mr Fish" – Sparzanza
"Slaughter House" – Macabre
"Three Bedrooms in a Good Neighborhood" − Death Grips
"The Werewolf of Westeria" – John 5

Lavinia Fisher
"Pretty Lavinia" – American Murder Song

G–J

John Wayne Gacy
"33 Something" – Bathory
"Clownin' Around" - Deer Tick
"Finger Paintings of The Insane" - Acid Bath
"Gacy's Lot" – Macabre
"Gacy's Place" - The Mentally Ill
"John Wayne Gacy" – SKYND
"John Wayne Gacy, Jr." – Sufjan Stevens
"Johnny's in Love With You" - The Bang
"Master of Brutality (John Wayne Gacy)" – Church of Misery
"Pogo The Clown" – Dog Fashion Disco
"Pogo The Clown" – Hubert Kah
"Reign In Blood" - Necro
"Stinky" – Macabre
"Suffer Age" – Fear Factory
"Three for Flinching (Revenge of the Porno Clowns)" – The Dillinger Escape Plan
"Unaccommodating" - Eminem

Harvey Murray Glatman
"Harvey Glatman (Your Soul Will Forever Rot)" – Macabre

Grim Sleeper
"Twistin'" – Lil Ugly Mane (featuring Denzel Curry)

Carl Großmann
"The Sweet Tender Meat Vendor" - Macabre

Belle Gunness
"The Ballad Of Belle Gunness" – TJ McFarland
"Bella The Butcher" – Macabre
"Belle Gunness" – Cassius
"Black Widow of La Porte" – John 5

Fritz Haarmann
"Fritz Haarman der Metzger" – Macabre
"Fritz Haarman the Butcher" – Macabre
"Warte Warte" – Macabre

John George Haigh
"Acid Bath Vampire" – Macabre
"Make Them Die Slowly (John George Haigh)" - Church of Misery

Jack the Ripper
"Blood Red Sandman" – Lordi
"The Death of Jack the Ripper" – The Legendary Pink Dots
"Down on Whores" – Benediction
"Fall" - Eminem
"In the Mind of a Lunatic" – Sigh
"Jack" – Iced Earth
"Jack the Knife" – The Electric Hellfire Club
"Jack the Ripper" – Nationalteatern
"Jack the Ripper" – Screaming Lord Sutch
"Jack the Ripper" – Buckethead
"Jack the Ripper" - Hobbs' Angel of Death
"Jack the Ripper" – LL Cool J
"Jack The Ripper" – Macabre
"Jack the Ripper" – Morrissey
"Jack the Ripper" – Motorhead
"Jack the Ripper" – Nick Cave and The Bad Seeds
"Jack the Ripper" – Rob Kelly
"Jack The Ripper" – The Horrors
"Jack the Ripper" – The Fuzztones
"Jack the Ripper in Heaven" – Club Moral
"Killer on the Loose" - Thin Lizzy
"Life Is a Rock (But the Radio Rolled Me)" – Reunion
"Maxwell Murder" – Rancid
"Music Box" - Eminem
"Must be the Ganja" - Eminem
"Reconstruction of the Female Anatomy" - Through the Eyes of the Dead
"Respite on the Spitalfields" - Ghost
"The Ripper" – Judas Priest
"Saucy Jack" – Spinal Tap
"She Knows" – Ne-Yo Feat. Juicy J
The Somatic Defilement – Whitechapel
"Tombstone Blues" − Bob Dylan
"Unsolved Mysteries" – Animal Collective

K–M

Theodore Kaczynski
"Body Parts" – Three 6 Mafia
"Exploding Octopus" – Ill Bill
"FC: The Freedom Club" – Sleepytime Gorilla Museum
"I Wanna Be a Unabomber" – Donnas
"Killer Kaczynski" – Mando Diao
"Militia Song" – Camper Van Beethoven
"Unabomber" – J. Cole
"The Unabomber" – Macabre
"Unabomber" – M.I.R.V.
"Unabomber" – The Acacia Strain
"Unabomber" – Underground Resistance

Edmund Kemper
"Abomination Unseen" – Devourment
"Edmund Kemper Had a Terrible Temper" – Macabre
"Edmund Temper" – Amigo the Devil
"Forever" – The Berzerker
"Fortress/Outer Space/Forever" – System of a Down
"Killifornia (Ed Kemper)" – Church of Misery
"Murder" – Seabound
"Severed Head" – Suicide Commando
"Temper Temper Mr. Kemper" – The Celibate Rifles
"Urge to Kill" – Throbbing Gristle

Joachim Kroll
"Evil Ole Soul" – Macabre

Richard Kuklinski
"The Iceman" – Macabre
"Lyrical Hitman (Richard Kuklinski)" – Royce Da 5'9" and Marvwon

Peter Kürten
Dedicated to Peter Kurten – Whitehouse
"Dusseldorf Monster" - Church of Misery
"In Germany Before the War" – Randy Newman
"Vampire of Düsseldorf" – Macabre

Lawrence Bittaker & Roy Norris
"The Murder Mack" – Macabre

Leonard Lake & Charles Ng
"The Ballad of Leonard and Charles" – Exodus
"The Lake Of Fire" – Macabre
"Macerate and Petrify" – Venetian Snares

Leonarda Cianciulli
"Teacakes" – Macabre

Henry Lee Lucas & Ottis Toole
"Henry: Portrait of a Serial Killer" - Fantômas
"Let's Be Bad, Henry" - the pAper chAse
"Lucas Toole" - Downthesun
"Murder Company" – Church of Misery
"Serial Killer"  – Macabre
”While You Sleep, I Destroy Your World”- Nailbomb

Herman Mudgett (a.k.a. H. H. Holmes)
"Dr. Holmes (He Stripped Their Bones)" – Macabre
"From the Cradle to the Grave" - Havok
"Infecting them with Falsehood" – Deeds of Flesh
"Them Dry Bones" - Macabre
"The Torture Doctor"- Alkaline Trio

Herbert Mullin
"Megalomania (Herbert Mullin)" – Church of Misery

N–R

Dennis Nilsen
"Cranley Gardens" (Denis Nilsen) – Church of Misery
"Killing for Company" – Swans
"Turnabout" — Moth Wranglers
"When Lovers Die" – Children on Stun
"You're Dying To Be With Me" – Macabre

Carl Panzram
"Reminiscences of a Minnesota State Training School Alumni, Class of 1905" – Flare Acoustic Arts League

Christopher Peterson
"Shotgun Peterson" – Macabre

Alexander Pichushkin
"Sewers" – Torture Killer

Robert Pickton
"Fed To The Pigs" – Devourment
"Hooker Fortified Pork Products"- The Accüsed
"Pigfarm" – Mad Sin

Dorothea Puente
"Dorthea's Dead Folks Home" – Macabre

Dennis Rader
"Bind, Torture and Kill" – Suicide Commando
"Bind Torture Kill" – Suffocation
"B.T.K." - Church of Misery
"BTK" - Exodus
”Lotta True Crime” - Penelope Scott
"Raider II" - Steven Wilson

Gilles de Rais
"Barbazul versus el amor letal" - Patricio Rey y sus Redonditos de Ricota
"The Black Knight" – Macabre
 Godspeed on the Devil's Thunder - Cradle of Filth
"Into the Crypts of Rays" – Celtic Frost
"Tritt Ein" – Saltatio Mortis
"The Window" - The Black Dahlia Murder

Richard Ramirez
"Acosador Nocturno" - Soulfly
"City of Angels" - Testament
"Godzilla" - Eminem
"Going Going Gone" – Exodus
"Kamikaze" - Eminem
"Killer" – King Diamond
"Knight Stalker" - Shadow Project
"Night Crawler" - Judas Priest
"Night Crawling" - Miley Cyrus featuring Billy Idol
"The Night Stalker" – Bewitched
"Night Stalker" – Macabre
"Night Stalker" – Super Heroines
"Noche Acosador" – John 5
"Nocturnal Predator" - Legion of the Damned
"Ramirez" - The Acacia Strain
"The Reflecting God" - Marilyn Manson
"Richard Ramirez" - SKYND
"Richard Ramirez Died Today Of Natural Causes" - Sun Kil Moon
"Smooth Criminal" - Michael Jackson
"Snake Eyes and Sissies" - Marilyn Manson
"Where Evil Dwells (Richard Ramirez)" – Church of Misery
"Your Window Is Open" – Macabre

Gary Ridgway
"Come On Down" - Green River
"Deep Red Bells" – Neko Case
"Green River" – Church of Misery
"The Green River Murderer (He's Still Out There)" – Macabre
"I Wanna Know What Love Is" - Julie Ruin
"Sane vs. Normal" - Mnemic
"You Can't Slip" - Sir Mix A Lot

Danny Rolling
"Danny Rolling" – The Murder Junkies

Richard Speck
"Born to Raise Hell (Richard Speck)" - Church of Misery
"Richard Speck Grew Big Breasts" – Macabre
"What the Heck Richard Speck? (Eight Nurses You Wrecked)" – Macabre

S

Shankill Butchers
"Shankill Butchers" – The Decemberists
"Shankill Butchers" – Sarah Jarosz

Harold Shipman
"Doctor Death ((Harold Shipman))" - Church of Misery
"Lips of Ashes" – Porcupine Tree
"What About Us?" - The Fall

Peter Stumpp
"Werewolf of Bedburg" – Macabre

Peter Sutcliffe
"Archives of Pain" - Manic Street Preachers
"Leeds Ripper" – Throbbing Gristle
"Leeds United" – Luke Haines
"Night Shift" – Siouxsie and the Banshees
"The Ripper" – Pallas
"Ripping Into Pieces (Peter Sutcliffe)" – Church of Misery

T–Z

Joseph Vacher
"The Ripper Tramp from France" - Macabre

Dorángel Vargas
"El Comegente" - Soulfly

Fred West/Rose West
"25 Cromwell St." - Apoptygma Berzerk
"Evil" – Interpol
"Strip the Soul" - Porcupine Tree

Aileen Wuornos
"Aileen" – Willam
"Disease of Men" – Kristin Hayter
"Filth Bitch Boogie (Aileen Wuornos)" – Church of Misery
"Holy Is the Name (Of My Ruthless Axe)" − Kristin Hayter
"If the Poison Won't Take You My Dogs Will" – Kristin Hayter
"Poor Aileen" – Superheaven
"Sixth Of June" – It Dies Today

Graham Frederick Young
"Poison" – Macabre
"Taste the Pain (Graham Young)" – Church Of Misery

Zodiac Killer
"Dear Editor" – Kamelot
"Death 2" – Flatbush Zombies
"Gemini" – Slayer
"Nostalgia in Lemonade" − Avey Tare
"Sick of Living (Zodiac)" – Church of Misery
"Soul Sacrifice" – Santana
"Venus in Furs" – Electric Wizard
"The Zodiac" – Kamelot
"Zodiac" – Macabre
"Zodiac" – Melvins
"Zodiac" - Six Feet Under
"Zodiac (He Is Still Out There.....)" – Christian Death
"Zodiac Shit" – Flying Lotus

See also
Serial killer
List of serial killers
Murder ballad

References

Further reading 
 Olive W. Burt, American Murder Ballads and their Stories, Oxford University Press, New York, 1958
 Olive W. Burt, "Murder Ballads of Mormondom", Western Folklore, 18:2, April 1959, pp. 141–156
Olive W. Burt, "The Minstrelsy of Murder", Western Folklore, 17:4, October 1958, pp. 263–272
Daniel A. Cohen, "The Beautiful Female Murder Victim: Literary Genres and Courtship Practices in the Origins of a Cultural Motif, 1590–1850", Journal of Social History, 31:2, Winter 1997, pp. 277–306
 Chet Flippo, "Nashville Skyline: The Subject Was Murder", CMT.com, February 5, 2004
 Will Robinson Sheff, "The Dark Side of Folk: Songs about Murder", Audiogalaxy
 Michael E. Bush, "Murder Ballads in Appalachia", (thesis) Marshal University, Huntington, West Virginia, 1977
 Kenneth D. Tunnel, "99 Years is Almost For Life: Punishment for Violent Crime in Bluegrass Music", The Journal of Popular Culture, 26:3, Winter 1992, pp. 165–181
 Ellen L. O'Brien, "THE MOST BEAUTIFUL MURDER”: THE TRANSGRESSIVE AESTHETICS OF MURDER IN VICTORIAN STREET BALLADS", Victorian Literature and Culture, 28, 2000, pp. 15–37

Further listening (recorded compilations) 
 Bloody Ballads: Classic British and American Murder Ballads, Sung  by Paul Clayton, Ed. by Kenneth S. Goldstein, Riverside Records, New York, 1956 (includes cover notes)
 Blood Booze 'n Bones, Sung by Ed McCurdy, banjo accompaniment by Erik Darling, Elektra Records, 1956 (includes 12 page booklet)
 Murder Ballads, by Nick Cave and the Bad Seeds, Mute Records, 1996
 Murder Metal, Macabre, 2003 (This band appears to have become known for a death metal variation of the murder ballad)

Killers
Serial killers
Works about serial killers